Nano City was a project proposed by the Haryana government and Sabeer Bhatia (co-founder of Hotmail) to build a city similar to Silicon Valley in northern India. The city was intended to cover 11,000 acres of land near Panchkula.

History
The proposal to construct Nano City was formally approved by the state government of Haryana in September 2006, having first been proposed by Sabeer Bhatia. It envisaged a joint venture between the state-owned Haryana State Industrial and Infrastructure Development Corporation and a private venture owned by Bhatia. The city was to be constructed in two phases, the first covering 5,000 acres of land and the second a further 6,000. The proposal was  Real estate firm Parsvnath Developers joined the project in July 2008.

The city was intended to include an airport, a golf course and a rapid transit system. However, by May 2010 no progress had been made. It was reported that Bhatia had failed to submit detailed plans for its construction. In July 2010 the project was cancelled by the HSIIDC.

See also 
Information technology in India

References

External links 
 

Buildings and structures in Haryana
Information technology projects
Information technology in India
Urban planning in India
Haryana